Daniel "Boom" Herron (born March 21, 1989) is a former American football running back. Herron played football at Warren G. Harding High School in Warren, Ohio, and later Ohio State University. He was drafted in the sixth round of the 2012 NFL draft by the Cincinnati Bengals, and also played for the Indianapolis Colts and Buffalo Bills.

Early career
As he grew into upper class, Herron starred as the featured running back in high school for the Warren G. Harding Raiders. He amassed his best season as a Junior, rushing for over 1,500 yards and 17 touchdowns. When asked what he thought of his player, then Harding coach Thom Mcdaniels replied, "I wouldn’t trade “Boom” for any running back in Ohio." Coming out of high school, he ran a 40 yard dash in the mid 4.5's and boasted an impressive 37 inch vertical. Scout.com had him ranked as the 27th best backfield recruit in the country.

College career
Herron spent five years at The Ohio State University. He was a four-time letterman. In 2008, he struggled to get playing time over future NFL back Beanie Wells and again in 2009 splitting time with Brandon Saine in an offense heavily centered around the running talents of quarterback Terrelle Pryor. In 2010, Herron delivered as the starter, totaling 1,155 yards and 16 touchdowns. Later that year, just a week before the team's appearance in their bowl game, it became apparent that Herron, amongst other top Buckeye players, was facing substantial NCAA sanctions.

On December 23, 2010, Herron and four other Ohio State players were suspended for the first five games of the 2011 season, but were still allowed to play in that year's Sugar Bowl, which they won 31-26 in a game against Arkansas. Herron was said to have sold a jersey, pants, and shoes that he had previously worn in a game. The other suspended players were quarterback Terrelle Pryor, wide receiver DeVier Posey, offensive lineman Mike Adams, and defensive end Soloman Thomas.

On October 3, 2011, in an unrelated story, Herron was suspended for one more week due to being overpaid during a summer job in the Cleveland area. Despite the six-week suspension, Herron was elected a team captain by his teammates and went on to rush for 675 yards and three touchdowns the remainder of the season.

Collegiate statistics

Professional career

Cincinnati Bengals

Herron signed a four-year deal through 2015 with the Cincinnati Bengals on May 23, 2012. On August 31, 2012, he was cut by the Bengals. On December 4, 2012, Herron was recalled to the Bengals active roster after spending the first part of the season on the practice squad. On December 13, 2012, Herron blocked a punt against the Philadelphia Eagles; in the same game he had his first carry. He ended the game with three carries for eight yards.

Indianapolis Colts

The Indianapolis Colts signed Herron on October 9, 2013. On November 30, 2014, in a game against the Washington Redskins, Herron recorded his first career rushing touchdown, on a career-long 49-yard run to put Indianapolis up 14-3. The Colts ended the game with a 49-27 victory. In his first postseason game, Herron rushed 12 times for 56 yards and a touchdown, adding 10 receptions for 85 yards as the Colts defeated his former team, the Cincinnati Bengals, 26–10. The following week, Herron touched the ball a career-high 31 times (23 carries, eight receptions) and recorded a combined 95 yards and one rushing touchdown to help Indianapolis defeat the Denver Broncos 24–13. Herron was tendered a contract at the end of the season, as an exclusive-rights free agent. On April 1, he signed his tender. Herron was waived injured on September 6, 2015.

Buffalo Bills
On October 6, 2015, Herron signed with the Buffalo Bills. On November 25, 2015, he was released.

Indianapolis Colts (second stint) 
On November 26, 2015, Herron was claimed off waivers by the Indianapolis Colts. On March 9, 2016, Herron did not receive a tender from the Colts, thus making him a free agent.

Buffalo Bills (second stint)
On June 9, 2016, Herron was signed by the Buffalo Bills. On September 2, 2016, he was released by the Bills as part of final roster cuts.

NFL career statistics

Regular season

Postseason

Personal life
His brother, David Herron, is former NFL linebacker who played college football for the Michigan State Spartans.

References

External links
 
Buffalo Bills bio
Indianapolis Colts bio

1989 births
Living people
American football running backs
Buffalo Bills players
Cincinnati Bengals players
Indianapolis Colts players
Ohio State Buckeyes football players
Sportspeople from Warren, Ohio
Players of American football from Ohio